"Colder Weather" is a song by American country music group Zac Brown Band. Lead singer Zac Brown co-wrote the song with Coy Bowles (the band's keyboardist and guitarist), Wyatt Durrette and Levi Lowrey. It is the band's seventh single release overall, and the second single from their 2010 album You Get What You Give.

Content
The lyric is about a trucker who is on the road, and separated from his lover due to the weather. Co-writer Wyatt Durrette told The Boot:

"Colder Weather" is in the key of E-flat major, with the guitars set to E♭ tuning. In this song, Brown's vocals range from B2 to A4.

Critical reception
The song has received primarily positive reviews from critics. Jessica Phillips of Country Weekly, in her review of the album, called it "lyrically profound," and Eric R. Danton of the Hartford Courant said that it was the "sorrowful, solitary kind of song with an old-school country-ballad feel made for crisp nights in the high country." Giving it a "thumbs up," Karlie Justus of Engine 145 called it "loneliness and longing set to music", also praising the production and lyrics. She compared the song's style to Merle Haggard. Jonathan Keefe of Slant Magazine was less favorable, calling the song "somewhat strident and inorganic."

Music video
The music video was directed by Darren Doane and premiered in February 2011. Australian actor Liam Hemsworth appeared in the video portraying the male character who temporarily leaves his girlfriend during the winter.  Tori McPetrie portrays his girlfriend.

Charts and certifications

Weekly charts

Year-end charts

Certifications

References

External links
Official Music Video

Songs about weather
2011 singles
2010 songs
Zac Brown Band songs
Song recordings produced by Keith Stegall
Atlantic Records singles
Bigger Picture Music Group singles
Country ballads
Songs written by Levi Lowrey
Songs written by Zac Brown
Songs written by Wyatt Durrette (songwriter)